Britannia Heights is a major inner suburb of Nelson, New Zealand.

The suburb has two local reserves: Moncrieff Reserve and Pipers Park Reserve.

References

Suburbs of Nelson, New Zealand
Populated places in the Nelson Region
Populated places around Tasman Bay / Te Tai-o-Aorere